Eleazar ben Arach was one of the tannaim of the second generation (1st century CE).

Teachings
Being first among the disciples of Rabban Yochanan ben Zakai, he delighted his master with his wisdom and penetration, so that the most extravagant praises were lavished upon him. It was said, "If all the sages of Israel were placed in one scale, and Eleazar ben Arach in the other, he would outweigh them all", and Yochanan described him as a "gushing stream" or "ever-flowing spring".

Yochanan once asked his students, "What is the best thing, the one that a person should cherish most?" Several solutions were handed in, among them one from Eleazar, who suggested, "A good heart"; thereupon Yochanan remarked, "I prefer Eleazar's solution to all of yours, since yours are included in his". Again, Yochanan asked, "What is the worst thing, the one that a person should shun most?" In this case, also, Eleazar's reply, "An evil heart," was preferred by the teacher because it included all the others.

Eleazar also distinguished himself in the mystical interpretation of the Tanakh, and to such an extent as to call forth his master's ecstatic exclamation, "Happy are you, O father Abraham, from whose loins sprang Eleazar ben Arach". To his counsel, often sought and always beneficial, was applied the Biblical expression, "Whatever he does shall prosper". Beneficiaries of his counsel in their admiration called him "Prophet"; to which he replied, "I am neither a prophet nor the son of a prophet, but my teachers have communicated to me the traditional truth that every counsel subserving the promotion of the glory of God realizes good results". His motto was, "Be diligent in the pursuit of study; be prepared to respond to an Epicurean (i.e. a heretic); and know for whom you toil and who will pay you the reward of your labor."

Later life
Eleazar's name is connected with only a few halakhot, and with only one halakhic midrash. The reason for this paucity of teachings is found in the story of the period immediately succeeding the death of Yochanan ben Zakai. The disciples chose Yavne for their scene of activity, while Eleazar went to Emmaus, the residence of his wife — a particularly healthful place, blessed with good water, a pleasant climate, and warm baths.

Separated from his colleagues, his faculties became stunted, and he is said to have completely forgotten all he had ever learned. In later years he was pointed out as a warning to the self-opinionated; the Talmud applying to him the motto of Nehorai: "Go to a place where the Law is studied, and do not say that the Torah will follow you, for it is your companions who will make it your permanent possession. Do not rely upon your own understanding".

References

The Jewish Encyclopedia cites the following bibliography:
 Wilhelm Bacher, Die Agada der Tannaïten, i. 74 et seq.
 Jakob Brüll, Mebo ha-Mishnah, i. 87.
 Zecharias Frankel, Darke ha-Mishnah, p. 91.
 Jacob Hamburger, Real-Enzyklopädie für Bibel und Talmud, ii. 155.
 Jehiel ben Solomon Heilprin, Seder ha-Dorot, ii. s.v.
 Isaac Hirsch Weiss, Dor Dor we-Dorshaw, ii. 80.
 Abraham Zacuto, Sefer Hayuhasin. Filipowski edition, p. 35b.

External links
 Jewish Encyclopedia article for Eleazar ben Arach, by Solomon Schechter and Samuel Mendelsohn

Mishnah rabbis
1st-century rabbis
Pirkei Avot rabbis